The 181st Massachusetts General Court, consisting of the Massachusetts Senate and the Massachusetts House of Representatives, met in 1999 and 2000 during the governorship of Paul Cellucci. Tom Birmingham served as president of the Senate and Thomas Finneran served as speaker of the House.

Notable legislation included the Community Preservation Act.

Senators

Representatives

See also
 106th United States Congress
 List of Massachusetts General Courts

References

Further reading

External links
 
 
 
 
 
 

Political history of Massachusetts
Massachusetts legislative sessions
massachusetts
1999 in Massachusetts
massachusetts
2000 in Massachusetts